The Inughuit (also spelled Inuhuit), or the Smith Sound Inuit, historically Arctic Highlanders, are Greenlandic Inuit. Formerly known as "Polar Eskimos", they are the northernmost group of Inuit and the northernmost people in North America, living in Greenland. Inughuit make up about 1% of the population of Greenland.

Language 
The Inughuit speak Inuktun, also known as North Greenlandic, Thule Inuit, or Polar Eskimo. It is a dialect of Inuktitut, an Eskimo–Aleut language related to the Greenlandic language spoken elsewhere in Greenland.
In Kalaallisut, the official dialect of Greenlandic, Inuktun is called Avanersuarmiutut.

Population 
Before 1880, their population was estimated to be between 100 and 200 people. From 1880 to 1930, they were estimated to number 250. In 1980, their estimated population was 700, and it rose to 800 in 2010.

History

Early history 
The Inughuit are believed to be descended from the Thule people who spread across the North American Arctic around the eleventh century. They used and traded iron from meteorites such as the Cape York meteorite. The earliest discovered Thule settlement is found in modern-day Uummannaq (Dundas). There were also extensive contacts with other Inuit from different regions. Around the 17th century, climate change cooled the northwest areas of Greenland which cut off the Inughuit from other Inuit and regions.

It was during this time that the Inughuit developed their unique language, culture, and fashion - all of which differ significantly from other Inuit. Around this period, the Inughuit also lost the ability and skills to build kayaks or umiaks, which inevitably further restricted travel and contact with other communities.

Modern history 
The Inughuit were first contacted by Europeans in 1818, when John Ross led an expedition into their territory. Ross dubbed them "Arctic Highlanders". They are believed to have previously lived in total isolation, to the point of being unaware of other humans, and are cited as one of the only non-agricultural societies to live without armed feuds or warfare, a state that continued after contact. Erik Holtved, a Dane, was the first university-trained ethnologist to study the Inughuit.

During the mid-19th century, Inuit from Baffin visited and lived with the Inughuits. The Baffin Inuit reintroduced some technologies lost to the Inughuit such as boats, leisters, and bows and arrows. The Inughuit in their part taught the Baffin Inuit a more advanced form of sled technology. American and European explorers in the 19th and early-20th centuries had extensive contacts with the Inughuits. Explorers Robert Peary and Frederick Cook both had Inughuits in their teams acting as guides. However, more sustained contact with outsiders changed many aspects of Inughuit life by creating a dependence on trade goods and introducing new diseases.

Greenlandic anthropologist and explorer Knud Rasmussen established a trading post in Uummannaq (Dundas) in 1910. He also worked to modernize Inughuit society by establishing a governing hunter's council for the Inughuit in 1927. It was during this period that Christian missionaries arrived in the region to evangelize. In consequence of the relative isolation of the Inughuit, the Inughuit remained absent from growing Greenlandic Inuit nationalism and the nation-building process sweeping the Inuit of western and southern Greenland. The subsequent Cold War era had substantial effects on the Inughuit. In the 1950s, the United States established Thule Air Base close to Uummannaq (Dundas).

Settlements 
Inughuit people live north of the Arctic Circle on the west coast of Greenland, between 75°—80° N and 58°–74° W. The northernmost settlement was at the village of Etah (at 78° 19' N), but it was abandoned due to the extremely harsh conditions there. The northernmost constant settlement is now Hiurapaluk.

Pituffik, also known as "Dundas" or "Thule" to Europeans, was the chief settlement of the Inughuit until 1953 when it was displaced by the United States' Thule Air Base, with its residents relocated to Qaanaaq. Established in 1953, Qaanaaq is the largest Inughuit settlement.

See also 
 1968 Thule Air Base B-52 crash

References

External links 
 The Inughuit tribe of Northern Greenland, BBC
 Recognizing the Inughuit as a Distinct Indigenous People of Greenland and their Right to Return to their Traditional Lands, Inuit Circumpolar Conference Executive Council Resolution 03-02

 
Greenlandic Inuit people
Inuit groups